Blundeston Mill is a  tower mill at Blundeston, Suffolk, England which has been converted to residential accommodation.

History

Blundeston Mill was built c1820 by Robert Martin, the Beccles millwright. The mill was worked until 1923 and dismantled in 1933 when it was converted to a house.

Description

Blundeston Mill is a four-storey tower mill which had four Patent sails. The boat shaped cap was winded by a fantail. The mill drove two pairs of millstones

References

External links
Windmill World Webpage on Blundeston Mill.
Blundeston and District Local History Society Webpage with some photographs of Blundeston Windmill.

Towers completed in 1820
Industrial buildings completed in 1820
Windmills in Suffolk
Tower mills in the United Kingdom
Grinding mills in the United Kingdom
Waveney District